Hwang Byeong-geun (Korean: 황병근; born 14 June 1994 in South Korea) is a South Korean footballer who plays for Busan IPark as a goalkeeper.

Career

Hwang started his senior career with Jeonbuk Hyundai Motors in 2015.

He joined Sangju Sangmu in the South Korean K League 1 for his military service, in April 2019, where he has made six appearances.

On 1 July 2022, he moved to Busan IPark of K League 2.

Honours

Club
Jeonbuk Hyundai Motors
 K League 1: 2015, 2017, 2018, 2021
 AFC Champions League: 2016

References

External links

 Sangju Hwang Byeong-geun returned, “The reason I was sluggish in Jeonbuk…”
 [https://archive.today/20200629225538/https://post.naver.com/viewer/postView.nhn?volumeNo=10413228&memberNo=29184633 NEXTAR-K GK Hwang Byung-geun departs late, puts a star on his chest
 FootballK WIKI Profile

1994 births
Living people
South Korean footballers
Association football goalkeepers
K League 1 players
K League 2 players
Jeonbuk Hyundai Motors players
Gimcheon Sangmu FC players
Busan IPark
Sportspeople from Daejeon